Bambalapitiya Grama Niladhari Division is a  Grama Niladhari Division of the  Thimbirigasyaya Divisional Secretariat  of Colombo District  of Western Province, Sri Lanka .

Kollupitiya, Amana Bank (Sri Lanka), Ministry of Telecommunication, Digital Infrastructure and Foreign Employment, Mahanama College, E FM, Ceylon University College, University of Colombo, Saifee Villa, Navarangahala and Thurstan College  are located within, nearby or associated with Bambalapitiya.

Bambalapitiya is a surrounded by the  Milagiriya, Kurunduwatta and Kollupitiya  Grama Niladhari Divisions.

Demographics

Ethnicity 

The Bambalapitiya Grama Niladhari Division has  a Sinhalese plurality (40.5%), a significant Moor population (28.2%) and a significant Sri Lankan Tamil population (21.7%) . In comparison, the Thimbirigasyaya Divisional Secretariat (which contains the Bambalapitiya Grama Niladhari Division) has  a Sinhalese majority (52.8%), a significant Sri Lankan Tamil population (28.0%) and a significant Moor population (15.1%)

Religion 

The Bambalapitiya Grama Niladhari Division has  a Buddhist plurality (32.5%), a significant Muslim population (30.2%) and a significant Hindu population (20.2%) . In comparison, the Thimbirigasyaya Divisional Secretariat (which contains the Bambalapitiya Grama Niladhari Division) has  a Buddhist plurality (47.9%), a significant Hindu population (22.5%) and a significant Muslim population (17.4%)

Gallery

References 

Grama Niladhari Divisions of Thimbirigasyaya Divisional Secretariat